The Piano Concerto No. 2 in G minor, Op. 22 by Camille Saint-Saëns was composed in 1868 and is probably Saint-Saëns' most popular piano concerto. It was dedicated to Madame A. de Villers (née de Haber). At the première on 13 May the composer was the soloist and Anton Rubinstein conducted the orchestra. Saint-Saëns wrote the concerto in three weeks and had very little time to prepare for the première; consequently, the piece was not initially successful. The capricious changes in style provoked Zygmunt Stojowski to quip that it "begins with Bach and ends with Offenbach."

Overview 

The piece follows the traditional form of three movements but allows for more freedom in tempo markings. Normally, the first movement is fast-paced, while the second is slower, but the first movement here is slow and the second movement has a scherzo-like quality, resulting in a form resembling a typical four-movement symphony but lacking the first movement (a form also represented by Beethoven's Moonlight Sonata).

The movements in the concerto are:

The concerto is scored for solo piano, 2 flutes, 2 oboes, 2 clarinets, 2 bassoons, 2 horns, 2 trumpets, timpani, crash cymbals and strings. A performance lasts around 23 minutes.

Influences
The concerto, particularly the second movement, heavily influenced fellow French composer Gabriel Pierné's Piano Concerto in C minor of 1887.

Georges Bizet wrote a transcription of the concerto for solo piano.

The concerto is featured in the 2020 film "Nocturne".

Recordings

 Benno Moiseiwitsch, piano, London Philharmonic Orchestra, conducted by Basil Cameron. 1947, report CD Naxos 2002,
Benno Moiseiwitsch, piano, Royal Philharmonic Orchestra, conductor Sir Eugene Goossens 1960, report CD Classica (Les introuvables) 2020 (3e mouvement)
Moura Lympany, piano, London Philharmonic, dir. Jean Martinon. LP London records 1951
Arthur Rubinstein, piano, New York Philharmonic Orchestra, conductor Dimitri Mitropoulos (Live 19/04/1953). CD Guild Music 2009
 Emil Gilels, piano, Orchestre de La Société des Concerts du Conservatoire, conductor André Cluytens. LP Columbia 11/1954, report SACD Praga 2013. Diapason d'or. piano concerto n°4 S

Daniel Adni, piano, Royal Liverpool Philharmonic Orchestra, Sir Charles Groves. LP EMI 1976

 Arthur Rubinstein, piano, Symphony Of The Air, conductor Alfred Wallenstein LP RCA Victor 1958 report CD BMG Classics 1996

Malcolm Binns, piano, London Philharmonic Orchestra, conductor Alexander Gibson. LP World Record Club 1968
Orazio Frugoni, piano, Pro Musica Symphony Vienna, conductor, Hans Swarosky (with concerto n°5). LP Turnabout/Vox 1976

Ruth Slenczynska, piano, Symphony of the Air, conductor Henry Swoboda LP Decca 1959 report DG Éloquence 2020. Diapason d'or 2021
Grigory Sokolov, piano, URSS Symphony Orchestra, conducted by Neeme Järvi. LP Melodie Angel 1966.
 Arthur Rubinstein, piano, The Philadelphia Orchestra, conductor Eugene Ormandy. CD RCA Victor 1970 report CD Sony 2013.
 François-René Duchable, piano, Orchestre Philharmonique de Strasbourg, conductor Alain Lombard. CD Erato 1982.
Cécile Ousset, piano, City of Birmingham Symphony Orchestra, conductor Simon Rattle. CD Emi 1982

 Nelson Freire, piano, Radio Symphonie-Orchester Berlin, conductor Adam Fisher.Live recording 1986. CD Audite Musikproduktion 2017.
Israel Margalit, piano, London Philharmonic Orchestra, conductor Bryden Thomson. CD Chandos 1987
 Stephen Hough, piano, City of Birmingham Symphony Orchestra, conductor Sakari Oramo. 2 CD Hyperion 2000 - 2001. Gramophone Awards record of the year 2002. Diapason d'or, Choc Le Monde la Musique.
Peter Toperczer, piano, Slovac Philharmonic, conductor Zdenek Kosler. CD Naxos 2000

Nicolaï Petrov, piano, (Georges Bizet's single piano transcript, 1868). CD Olympia 2002
Franz Vorraber, piano, Anhaltische Philarmonie Dessau, conductor Golo Berg. CD Thoroffon (Bella Musica) 2003
Brigitte Engerer, piano, Ensemble Orchestral de Paris, conductor Andrea Quin (with concerto n°5). CD Mirare 2008
 Howard Shelley, piano, Orchestra of Opera North, piano and conducting, CD Chandos 2009
Emmanuel Despax, piano, Orpheus Sinfonia, conducted by Thomas Carroll. CD Signum classics 2013
Louis Schwizgebel, piano, BBC Symphony Orchestra, conductor Fabien Gabel (with concerto n°5). CD Aparté 2015
Vadym Kholodenko, piano, Orchestre de la Radio Norvégienne, conductor Miguel Harth-Bedoya. CD Harmonia Mundi 2016
Andrew von Oeyen, piano, PKF-Prague Philarmonie, conductor Emmanuel Vuillaume. CD Warner Classics 2017
 Bertrand Chamayou, piano, Orchestre National de France, conductor Emmanuel Krivine. CD Erato 2019. Gramophone Awards, Choc de Classica.
 Nathanaël Gouin, piano, (Georges Bizet's single piano transcript 1868). CD Mirare 2020
 Jeanne-Marie Darré, piano, Orchestre National de la Radiodiffusion Française, conductor Louis Fourestier, recorded 1955. Published as CD EMI Music France 1996

Notes

External links

Piano concerto 2
1868 compositions
Compositions in G minor